Lissodema cursor is a species of beetle belonging to the family Salpingidae.

It is native to Europe.

References

Salpingidae